The Chosen One is a 2010 American comedy-drama film directed by and starring Rob Schneider as a car salesman facing a midlife crisis with the aid of native Colombian shamans. It also stars Steve Buscemi, Holland Taylor, and Peter Riegert.

Plot

A depressed car salesman (Rob Schneider) is repeatedly interrupted in the act of suicide by a coworker from the Nissan dealership, a beautiful woman translator (Carolina Gómez), three native American shamans of the Arhuaco people from the mountains of Colombia, and a phone call from his mother (Holland Taylor). He finally finds faith in himself after the rest of world puts its faith in him. The sole being on earth who can save mankind from its own destruction with trust - The Chosen One.

Cast
 Rob Schneider as Paul
 Steve Buscemi as Neal
 Holland Taylor as Ruth
 Peter Riegert as Bob
 Samantha Smith as Christine
 George Dzundza as Norman
 Jack McGee as Produce Manager
 Michael Yama as Mr. Nakamuri
 Carolina Gómez as Marissa
 Pamela Guest as Bird Lady
 Antonio Miguel Calvo as The Mama Arhuaco
 Alberto Villafana as Arhuaco Jim
 Yesid Villafana as Funny Arhuaco
 Ian Fisher as Cabbie

Production
Release of the film was delayed for three years; this may have been due to uncertainty over how to market the film, as this movie which is primarily dramatic was inaccurately marketed as a straightforward comedy.  The movie was eventually completed and released direct to video by Chosen One Productions RS LLC.

Reception

Critical response
Film Critics United, a pseudo-anonymous on-line movie review website, wrote that Schneider gave a good performance, but the film failed due to other factors including its muddled plot.  Brian Orndorf  described it as an attempt at a more serious dramatic role, but was critical, finding the film a failure.  Qwipster found the narrative "lazy" and the plot too bizarre to take seriously, scoring it 2/5 while praising Schneider's restrained performance.  DVD Verdict gave it a middling rating.

Lawsuits
There was a lawsuit from Schneider's collaborator Bob Rubin in 2008 over a fee he felt he was due for helping to arrange financing for the film.

In 2012, Schneider, his brother John Schneider, and the film's production companies (Chosen One Productions RS LLC, Chosen One TWF LLC, and The Chosen One RS LLC) were sued by financial backers to recover a $1.5 million investment. The plaintiffs alleged that the defendants had breached contracts with the plaintiffs and fraudulently induced the plaintiffs into investing in membership interests in one of the film's production companies. George and Nancy Gamble, a married couple, say that in 2008 they were persuaded to invest $1.5 million to complete postproduction work on "The Chosen One," and claim they were never repaid. According to Schneider, "The claims are flatly contradicted by the language of the contracts. The [plaintiffs] made an investment in the movie, with no guarantee of success."

On March 6, 2013, their lawsuit against Rob Schneider was moved from San Francisco to L.A. Superior Court. Legal counsel for Rob Schneider said in a statement: "The Gambles’ lawsuit is frivolous. The Gambles made an investment in the film, with no guarantee of success."

Notes

External links
 
 

2010 films
2010 comedy-drama films
2010 direct-to-video films
2010s English-language films
American comedy-drama films
American direct-to-video films
Direct-to-video comedy-drama films
Films directed by Rob Schneider
Films scored by Jeff Rona
Films with screenplays by Rob Schneider
2010s American films